Facades is the third studio album by English rock band Sad Café, released in September 1979 by RCA Records.

Recording
All of the songs were produced and engineered by Eric Stewart and recorded at Strawberry Studios South in Dorking, except for "Emptiness", which was produced by Sad Café, engineered by Mark Smith and recorded at The Village in West Los Angeles.

Release and reception
This was the first studio album by Sad Café to be released in North America. However, it had a slightly different track listing. The US version has a shorter edit of "Nothing Left Toulouse", which was retitled "Nothing Left to Lose". "Cottage Love" was also replaced with "Time is So Hard to Find" (the B-side to the "Strange Little Girl" single). "Every Day Hurts" was also retitled to "Everyday", but is exactly the same song. This version was also released in Canada; however, "Every Day Hurts" was not retitled. The album wasn't as successful in the US and only charted at number 146 on the Billboard 200.

Several singles were released from the album, with "Every Day Hurts" and "My Oh My" the most successful, reaching number 3 and 14 respectively on the UK Singles Chart. The album itself reached number 8 on the UK Albums Chart in April 1980 and was certified gold by the BPI in June.

The US version was reissued as a double CD set in 1998 by Renaissance Records, with the US version of Misplaced Ideals. In the UK, the album was reissued, also as a double CD set, in 2009 by Edsel Records, with the band's fourth album Sad Café.

Track listing

Personnel 

 Paul Young – lead vocals, percussion
 Ian Wilson – guitar, backing vocals
 Ashley Mulford – lead guitar, backing vocals
 Vic Emerson – keyboards
 John Stimpson – bass guitar, backing vocals
 Dave Irving – Drums
 Lenni Zaksen – saxophone on "Emptiness"

References 

1979 albums
Sad Café (band) albums
Albums produced by Eric Stewart
Albums recorded at Strawberry Studios
RCA Records albums
A&M Records albums